General elections were held in Guatemala on 6 September 2015 to elect the President and Vice President, all 158 Congress deputies, all 20 deputies to the Central American Parliament, and mayors and councils for all 338 municipalities in the country.

The Renewed Democratic Liberty became the largest party in Congress with 44 seats. Since no presidential candidate received more than 50% of the vote, a run-off took place on 25 October. Jimmy Morales won the contest, taking 67.4% of the vote, in a landslide victory over Sandra Torres.

It was the first presidential election since 1995 in which the runner-up of the previous contest did not then go on to win.

Background

Ahead of the election, the La Linea corruption case involving high-ranking officials of the outgoing administration, including President Otto Pérez Molina and Vice President Roxana Baldetti, was made public by the International Commission against Impunity in Guatemala. Baldetti resigned in May and was arrested on fraud charges in August. More than a dozen ministers and deputy ministers as well as a number of government officials also resigned. Less than a week before the election, President Pérez was stripped of his immunity, resigned and was arrested. Alejandro Maldonado Aguirre acts as head of state until a new president is elected and sworn into office. The scandal has further diminished many Guatemalans' trust in the political elite. Some of the participants of mass protests against corruption demanded a postponement of the election due to the crisis and claims of irregularities.

Possible Belize referendum
In May 2015, Belize allowed Guatemala to proceed with a referendum asking the International Court of Justice (ICJ) to definitively rule on Guatemala's longstanding territorial dispute against Belize, although Belize by its own admission was not ready for such a vote. A previous treaty between the two countries stipulated that any such vote must be held simultaneously. Guatemala was initially expected to hold its referendum on the issue during its second round of presidential elections in October 2015. Belize has yet to announce its vote on the matter.

When Jimmy Morales was running for president, a Guatemalan journalist asked Morales which Guatemalan historical event he thought was the most deplorable. Morales responded, "The most deplorable event – among all the things that have happened in Guatemala, there are certain things that are not spoken about and which I believe we should. Everything that goes contrary to national unity and territorial integrity are things that should hurt us. Something is happening right now, we are about to lose Belize. We have not lost it yet. We still have the possibility of going to the International Court of Justice where we can fight that territory or part of that territory. ... I think that it is worth anything that is natural resources and of benefit to the nation."

Electoral system
The President of Guatemala is elected using the two-round system. The 158 members of Congress are elected by two methods; 31 members are elected by closed list proportional representation in a single nationwide constituency, with seats allocated using the d'Hondt method. The other 127 seats are elected in 23 multi-member constituencies based on the departments (with the Central District or Guatemala City as a separate constituency) also using the d'Hondt method.

Around 7.5 million people registered for the elections. Members of the armed forces (Air Force, Army, and Navy), people in prison, and Guatemalans living abroad were not allowed to vote. The Tribunal Supremo Electoral (Supreme Electoral Tribunal) officially called for general elections on 2 May 2015.

Campaign

A total of 14 candidates were registered to contest the presidential elections:

Manuel Baldizón Mendez – Renewed Democratic Liberty (LIDER); born 1970; lawyer, entrepreneur, former Congressman, defeated in the runoff of the 2012 presidential election
Mario David García – Patriotic Party (PP); born 1946; lawyer and journalist, presenter of the political radio broadcast Hablando Claro ("Straight Talk")
Sandra Torres Casanova – National Unity of Hope (UNE); born 1955; former First Lady (wife of ex-president Álvaro Colom)
Lizardo Sosa – Todos; born 1945; former president of the Bank of Guatemala (2006–2010)
Roberto González Díaz-Durán – Commitment, Renewal and Order (CREO) + Unionist Party (PU); born 1970; entrepreneur, former minister of energy and mines (2004–05), defeated mayoral candidate of Guatemala City in 2007 and 2011
José Ángel López – Encounter for Guatemala (EG); born 1959, entrepreneur and banker, former president of the Rural Development Bank (Banrural), former longterm head of the National Association of Coffee (Anacafé)
Zury Ríos – Vision with Values (ViVa); born 1968; former Congresswoman, daughter of retired general, ex-President and military dictator Efraín Ríos Montt, wife of U.S. Representative Jerry Weller of Illinois
Miguel Ángel Sandoval – Guatemalan National Revolutionary Unity (URNG-Maiz) + Winaq; born 1949; sociologist and human rights activist, former guerilla fighter, advisor to the United Nations Development Programme, unsuccessful candidate in the 2007 presidential election (2.1%)
Jimmy Morales – National Convergence Front (FCN); born 1969, former actor, movie director and producer, known for his role in the comedy series Moralejas ("Morals") alongside his brother Sammy Morales
Alejandro Giammattei — Fuerza; born 1956; ex-director of the penitentiary system of Guatemala, unsuccessful candidate in the 2007 and 2011 presidential elections (17.2% and 1.1%, respectively)
Mario Estrada – National Change Union (UCN); born 1960; former Congressman, unsuccessful candidate in the 2007 and 2011 presidential elections (3.2% and 8.7%, respectively)
Luis Fernando Pérez – Institutional Republican Party (PRI); born 1969; manager, Congressman
Juan Guillermo Gutiérrez – National Advancement Party (PAN); born 1956; entrepreneur, unsuccessful candidate in the 2011 presidential election (2.8%)
Aníbal García – New Republic Movement (MNR); running mate of Nobel Prize laureate and unsuccessful candidate Rigoberta Menchú in the 2011 presidential election
In the buildup to the elections the Patriotic Party (PP) and Renewed Democratic Liberty (LIDER) were suspended due to repeated offences. However, all parties were reinstated before elections were called.

Opinion polls
A poll released on 3 September gave Morales 25% of the vote, compared to 22.9% for Manuel Baldizon and 18.4% for Sandra Torres.

Results

President
The front runners: Morales, Baldizón and Torres, were expected to competitively compete for the position of President. In the first round, Morales gained 24% of the vote, followed by a closely fought battle between Torres and Baldizón, with less than 20,000 votes separating the two. Since no candidate received a 50% majority, the top two candidates participated in the run-off in October. Morales won the run-off contest with 67.4% of the vote to Torres' 32.6%.  Morales, a comedic actor, won with the slogan "not corrupt, nor a thief".

Congress
In Congress, Baldizón's LIDER gained 31 seats on their previous election making them the largest party with 45 seats. Torres' UNE retained second position with 32 seats, despite losing 16. Competing in their first election, Todos captured 18 seats. PP suffered the greatest loss, losing 38 seats overall, down to 18. Morales' FCN gained 11 seats.

Reactions
Following his victory, Morales vowed "I will try with all my heart and strength not to disappoint you." The US-based National Public Radio described this a rightward shift among voters in both the Americas and Europe.

References

External links
Tribunal Supremo Electoral 

Elections in Guatemala
2015 in Guatemala
Guatemala
Presidential elections in Guatemala